Blonde is a 2001 American made-for-television biographical fiction film on the life of Marilyn Monroe, with Australian actress Poppy Montgomery in the lead role. The film was adapted from Joyce Carol Oates's 2000 Pulitzer Prize finalist novel of the same name.

Premise
A fictional biography of Marilyn Monroe mixed with a series of real events in her life. With glimpses into her childhood years, teenaged marriage to first husband Bucky Glazer, meeting with photographer Otto Ose, career with 20th Century Fox, relationship with her mother, her foster parents, Charles Chaplin Jr. (Cass), Edward G. Robinson Jr. (Eddie G), and her marriages to baseball player Joe DiMaggio and playwright Arthur Miller.

Cast
 Poppy Montgomery as Norma Jeane Baker / Marilyn Monroe
 Skye McCole Bartusiak as Young Norma Jeane
 Patricia Richardson as Gladys Pearl Baker
 Patrick Dempsey as Cass Bulut 
 Jensen Ackles as Eddie G.
 Kirstie Alley as Elsie - Grace Goddard
 Ann-Margret as Della Monroe
 Wallace Shawn as I.E. Shinn
 Titus Welliver as The Baseball Player
 Griffin Dunne as The Playwright
 Eric Bogosian as Otto Ose
 Niklaus Lange as Bucky Glazer
 Richard Roxburgh as Mr. R
 Emily Browning as Fleece
 Matthew O'Sullivan as Lee Strasberg
 Andrew Clarke as Laurence Olivier
 Shayne Greenman as Clark Gable
 Renee Henderson as Jane Russell

Reception
In the United States' review aggregator, the Rotten Tomatoes, in the score where the site staff categorizes the opinions of independent media and mainstream media only positive or negative, the film has an approval rating of 60% calculated based on five critics reviews. By comparison, with the same opinions being calculated using a weighted arithmetic mean, the score achieved is 3.3/10.

Steven Oxman of Variety considered that Blonde'''s approach as a work of fiction instead of a "based on true events" retelling allowed creators "to be far more imaginative in their suppositions about the characters' private thoughts" than similar works.

See also
 Blonde'', a 2022 Netflix adaptation of Oates' novel, starring Ana de Armas as Marilyn.

References

External links
 

2001 television films
2001 films
2001 biographical drama films
2000s English-language films
2000s American films
CBS network films
American biographical drama films
American drama television films
Films about Marilyn Monroe
Biographical films about actors
Films about playwrights
Films based on American novels
Films directed by Joyce Chopra
Films scored by Patrick Williams
Films set in Los Angeles
Films set in the 1940s
Films set in the 1950s
Films set in the 1960s
English-language drama films